Paul Dickov (born 1 November 1972) is a Scottish football manager, former professional footballer and television pundit.

Dickov played as a forward from 1990 to 2011, starting his career with Arsenal, where he won the UEFA Cup Winners Cup in 1994, but often struggled to hold a place in the first team and spent time on loan with Luton Town and Brighton & Hove Albion before moving to Manchester City in 1996 who were then in Division One. Over six seasons at the club, Dickov experienced two promotions and two relegations, playing in three different divisions. Dickov left in 2002 to join Leicester City, where he stayed for two seasons and, in 2004, he signed for Blackburn Rovers, and was part of the team which qualified for the UEFA Cup in 2005–06. Upon the expiry of his Blackburn contract in 2006, he rejoined Manchester City and later went on to play for Crystal Palace, Blackpool, Leicester City again, Derby County, and Leeds United. In 2000, he made his debut for Scotland, against San Marino. In total he represented his country ten times, scoring one goal. In 2010 he became manager of Oldham Athletic before taking over at Doncaster Rovers in 2013.

Club career

Arsenal
Born in Livingston, West Lothian, Dickov started playing football around the age of nine years playing for his local under-11 team Livingston United. Dickov continued to play for Livingston United each year and when he played in under-13 this is when he caught the eye of Arsenal Scout Malcolm McGregor. Dickov joined the youth ranks of Arsenal in 1989, before being promoted to the first team in 1990. Under George Graham chances were limited for Dickov as he struggled to break into the Arsenal team who were rich in talent with players such as Ian Wright. He was on the bench as the club won the UEFA Cup Winners' Cup in 1994,and beforehand he had been a member of Arsenal's squad during the first season of the Premier League. Whilst at Highbury he spent loan spells at both Luton Town and Brighton & Hove Albion. He left Arsenal in 1996 having made 26 appearances in all competitions, scoring seven goals.

Manchester City
Dickov joined Manchester City on 22 August 1996 in a transfer valued between £750,000 and £1 million, the final signing of Alan Ball's Manchester City management. He made his debut as a substitute against Stoke City on 24 August, a 2–1 defeat which was Ball's final match. Dickov made his first Manchester City start in the next match, in a 2–1 win over Charlton Athletic. Dickov joined the club in a period of turmoil; in his first season at Manchester City he played under five different managers (three full-time appointments and two caretakers). A regular starter under Asa Hartford, Steve Coppell and Phil Neal, he played less frequently under Frank Clark, and finished the season with five goals from 25 League starts. At the start of the 1997–98 season, Dickov did not feature in the first team, but was restored to the starting line-up following injuries to Uwe Rösler and Lee Bradbury. Dickov finished the season as the City's top scorer with nine goals, but the club were relegated to the third tier of English football for the first time in their history after finishing in 22nd place.

Dickov, wearing the number 9 shirt, played a supporting role in a striking partnership with Shaun Goater in the 1998–99 season, scoring 16 goals in all competitions, including a hat-trick against Lincoln City. After a slow start, his form improved in the later part of the season, leading to City manager Joe Royle nicknaming him "the crocus" due to him coming to life in the spring months.
He scored an important equaliser against Wigan Athletic in the play off semi final first leg (which was also the last goal to be scored at Springfield Park). The sixteenth goal was particularly crucial, a 15-yard, top corner injury time equaliser in the final of the promotion playoffs against Gillingham. Dickov's 95th-minute goal took the game to extra time, and the Manchester team ultimately won to earn promotion to the First Division. This goal, scored past Vince Bartram, the best man at Dickov's wedding, was voted City's Greatest Ever Goal in a 2005 poll conducted by Manchester City.

Dickov retained his place in the first team at the start of the 1999–2000 season. He started each of the first fifteen League games, despite suffering a facial injury on 26 September 1999 in which he lost a tooth. The run of starting appearances came to an end on 27 October, when he damaged knee ligaments in a match against Ipswich Town. During the subsequent absence, Manchester City signed Robert Taylor, and most of Dickov's appearances in the second half of the season were as a substitute. One of these substitute appearances was the final match of the season, a 4–1 win at Blackburn. Dickov scored the fourth Manchester City goal as City clinched promotion to the Premier League.

When Manchester City returned to the Premier League for the 2000–01 season, it appeared that Dickov's chances of playing would be limited as City signed former FIFA World Player of the Year George Weah and Costa Rican international Paulo Wanchope. However, Dickov earned a place in the team, his performances attracting the attention of Scotland manager Craig Brown, who called him up to the Scotland squad for the first time.

City were relegated back into the First Division for the 2001–02 season and Kevin Keegan replaced Joe Royle as manager. Dickov found his first team opportunities at the club limited especially as the team had other strikers such as Paulo Wanchope, Shaun Goater and Darren Huckerby. Having fallen out of favour, on 22 February 2002 he moved to Leicester City for £150,000.

Leicester City
Dickov's Leicester debut came in a 3–0 defeat against Derby County. His first goals for Leicester came in his sixth appearance, when he scored both Leicester goals in a 2–1 victory against Blackburn Rovers, the club's first win for four months. However, Dickov only scored two more goals that season. Leicester finished bottom and were relegated.

He scored a career-high of 20 goals in the 2002–03 season as Leicester made an immediate return to the top flight, finishing runners-up in Division One behind Portsmouth.

He managed to score 13 goals in the 2003–04 season. Leicester were subsequently relegated to the First Division and Dickov moved to Blackburn Rovers, declining an offer of an improved contract from Leicester and exercising a contractual clause which allowed him to join a Premier League club for a nominal fee.

On the final day of the 2003-04 season Leicester travelled to Dickov's former club, Arsenal, who were looking to make history by becoming the first English team since Preston North End to complete a top-flight league season unbeaten. Dickov scored the opening goal after 25 minutes, but Arsenal turned the game around to win 2-1 and become The Invincibles.

Blackburn Rovers
Dickov debuted for Blackburn Rovers as a half-time substitute against West Bromwich Albion on 14 August 2004. He scored his first goal for the club in the following match, a 3–2 defeat to Southampton. Dickov was involved in the majority of matches in the 2004–05 season, until a knee injury caused him to miss the last few weeks of the season. He finished the season with ten league goals. In 2005–06, Dickov found it hard to retain a regular place in the side, with manager Mark Hughes having signed forwards Craig Bellamy and Shefki Kuqi during the summer. A red card against West Ham United caused him to miss most of the first month of the season. He had a run of first team games in the autumn but starting appearances became fewer as the season progressed. He left the club in the summer of 2006 following the expiry of his contract.

Return to Manchester City
Dickov re-joined Manchester City on 26 May 2006, signing a two-year contract. He came on as a substitute in City's first game of the 2006–07 season against Chelsea, a 3–0 defeat. He then started the next three matches, including a 1–0 win over his former club Arsenal.

Dickov suffered several injuries over the course of the season, including a back problem, a knee injury and a toe injury, the latter sidelining him for four months. Dickov made nine starts and seven substitute appearances in 2006–07, but failed to score a single goal. In May 2007 he announced his interest in pursuing a coaching role upon retirement. He was transfer listed by Manchester City in August. He joined Crystal Palace on a three-month loan on 31 August 2007. He played his first game for the Eagles in a friendly against Crystal Palace Baltimore, Crystal Palace's American counterparts, on Friday 7 September, playing the full 90 minutes. On 31 January 2008, Dickov joined Blackpool managed by Simon Grayson on loan until May. Two days later he scored on his debut for Blackpool, what proved to be the winning goal in the Seasiders' 2–1 victory against Leicester City, one of his former clubs, at Bloomfield Road. He had come on as a 70th-minute substitute and scored the winning goal in the 89th minute. It was his first goal since 2 January 2006. He went on to score five goals in his first five appearances for the club, and on 4 March he was named as the Professional Footballers' Association (PFA)'s Fans Championship Player of the Month for February. By the end of his loan, Dickov had scored six goals in eleven appearances. He returned to Manchester City after his loan before then being released at the end of the season.

Return to Leicester City
An initial bid from his former club Leicester City was rejected a week earlier, and after pondering other offers from Toronto FC and Blackpool, Dickov decided to rejoin Leicester on 7 August 2008, signing a two-year contract. He made his debut in a 2–0 home win over Milton Keynes Dons on 9 August 2008, scoring his first goal in a 3–2 League Cup defeat to Fulham on 27 August. He made a total of 20 league games, scoring two goals as Leicester finished the 2008–09 season as League One champions. On 28 August 2009, Dickov joined Derby County on loan until January as cover. Due to an injury crisis Dickov found himself playing regularly at Derby, where his dogged style won over the support of the Derby fans. Dickov scored his first goal for Derby against Queens Park Rangers on 24 October 2009. After his loan spell at Derby ended, Dickov returned to Leicester in January 2010. He was released from his contract by Leicester on 1 February 2010 to find a new club.

Leeds United
On 3 March 2010, Dickov signed for Leeds United until the end of the season. It was initially thought that MLS side Toronto had beaten Leeds to Dickov's signature, however United eventually won the race for the Scot. Leeds also had to receive special dispensation from FIFA to sign Dickov due to the fact he had already played for two clubs this season, the maximum permitted. Dickov was named on Leeds' bench against Brentford and made his debut for Leeds when he came on as a late substitute. Made his impact as a Leeds player by getting booked immediately, scrapping with Brentford winger Ryan Dickson before the ball had come into play.

Dickov made his first start for Leeds in a defeat against Millwall, after replacing the injured Jermaine Beckford in the starting line-up. At the end of the 2009–10 season Leeds finished second thus earning promotion to the Championship. Dickov's contract was not renewed after promotion.

International career
Dickov played in Scotland's run in the 1989 FIFA U-16 World Championship, where he scored in the final, but went on to miss in the penalty shoot-out as Scotland lost to Saudi Arabia.	
He made his senior international debut on 7 October 2000, coming on as a substitute in a World Cup qualifier against San Marino. He made two further substitute appearances that year, against Croatia and Australia. Limited first-team opportunities at club level then meant Dickov was not selected for international duty for another two years. Good form at Leicester earned him a recall in September 2002. He made his first international start against the Faroe Islands. However, playing out of position on the wing, he was substituted at half-time as the faltering Scotland team drew 2–2 against a nation 62 places lower in the world rankings. In the return fixture a year later, Dickov scored his first international goal in a 3–1 win. His last cap came in a 1–0 defeat against Norway in October 2004. In total, Dickov earned ten Scotland caps and scored one goal.

Managerial career

Oldham Athletic
On 9 June 2010, Dickov signed a one-year contract with League One club Oldham Athletic to become player-manager following the departure of previous manager Dave Penney. It was Dickov's first attempt at managing and expected to be his last club as a player. His first competitive game as Oldham manager ended in a 2–1 victory at rivals Tranmere with Dale Stephens scoring both goals, Dickov also praised the travelling army of Oldham Fans. On 4 September 2010, he made his debut coming on as a second-half substitute against Bristol Rovers.

Dickov opted to build a youthful side and made controversial decisions at the start of the season to offload 2009–10 player of the year and club captain Sean Gregan as well as top scorer Paweł Abbott amongst other first team players. The team went into the New Year in ninth position, with games in hand on the teams above them, and being unbeaten at home in the league. Results in the second half of the season were less consistent and the team finished the season in the bottom half of the table. On 6 May 2011 Dickov announced that he would make only his second appearance of the season for the first team in the final match of the season, and would then end his playing career to concentrate on management. He then came on as a 77th-minute substitute the following day against Milton Keynes Dons.

They finished the 2011–12 Season in 16th position in League One, one place higher than the previous season.

On 27 January 2013, Dickov led Oldham to a shock 3–2 victory against Premier League team Liverpool in the FA Cup fourth round but resigned on 3 February, primarily due to the team's poor league form.

Doncaster Rovers
On 20 May 2013, Dickov was appointed manager of Doncaster Rovers, who were promoted to the Championship having won the League One title in the 2012–13 season. Doncaster were relegated back to League One after just one season following a 1–0 final day defeat to Leicester City. On 8 September 2015, Dickov was dismissed as Doncaster manager due to poor performances.

Style of play
Although he was a striker, Dickov was better known for his tenacity than his goal-scoring exploits. In a 2003 interview with the Independent on Sunday he provided a summary of his playing style: "The ability to battle is one of the main parts of my game. I know my limits. I am not the sort who gets the ball and is then going to beat five or six players and stick it in the top corner from God knows where. But, whether I'm playing well or not, the one thing you will get from me is 110 per cent, upsetting defenders and basically giving them pain." Rio Ferdinand was mentioning his name as the biggest headache to deal with on the pitch. His combative approach resulted in Manchester City manager Joe Royle naming him "The Wasp", and during his time at Leicester he was known as "The Pest".

Media career
Dickov now works as a television pundit, namely for Manchester City TV.

Personal life
Dickov is married to Janet and the couple have three children: Lauren, Max, and Sam. The family lives in Cheshire.

In March 2004, Dickov, along with Leicester City teammates Keith Gillespie and Frank Sinclair, was falsely accused of sexual assault while at a training camp in La Manga, Spain. All three were subsequently cleared when forensic tests showed the allegations were false. Dickov would later describe it as the "darkest period" of his footballing career.

Dickov owes his family name to a Bulgarian grandfather.

Career statistics

Club

International

Scores and results list Scotland's goal tally first, score column indicates score after Dickov goal.

Managerial statistics

Honours
Arsenal
UEFA Cup Winners' Cup: 1993–94

Manchester City
Football League Second Division play-offs: 1998–99
Football League First Division promotion: 1999–2000

Leicester City
Football League First Division runner-up: 2002–03
Football League One: 2008–09

Leeds United
Football League One runner-up: 2009–10

Individual
PFA Team of the Year: 2002–03 First Division

References

External links

1972 births
Living people
Sportspeople from Livingston, West Lothian
Scottish footballers
Scotland under-21 international footballers
Scotland international footballers
British people of Bulgarian descent
Association football forwards
Arsenal F.C. players
Blackburn Rovers F.C. players
Brighton & Hove Albion F.C. players
Derby County F.C. players
Leicester City F.C. players
Luton Town F.C. players
Manchester City F.C. players
Crystal Palace F.C. players
Blackpool F.C. players
Leeds United F.C. players
Oldham Athletic A.F.C. players
Livingston United F.C. players
Premier League players
English Football League players
Scottish football managers
Oldham Athletic A.F.C. managers
Doncaster Rovers F.C. managers
English Football League managers
Association football player-managers